Young Wizards is a series of novels by Diane Duane.

The Young Wizards series presently consists of eleven books, focusing on the adventures of two young wizards named Nita and Kit. Each novel pits Nita and Kit against the "Lone Power", an entity ultimately bent on the destruction of the entire universe. The series began in 1983 with the book So You Want to Be a Wizard, which told the story of their first experiences with wizardry. In 1997, Duane began a spin-off, the Feline Wizards series, which takes place in the same universe, but with different protagonists.

This series incorporates elements of fantasy, science fiction, and religion. The series deals with issues such as death, sacrifice, and redemption.

Books

Young Wizards

 
 
 
 
 
 
 
 
 
 
  
A short story within the same universe, "Uptown Local", was originally published as part of Jane Yolen's Dragons and Dreams anthology; it has also been included in the 20th anniversary edition of So You Want to Be a Wizard and as part of an ebook, Uptown Local and Other Interventions.

Interim Errantry is a collection of three stories set between A Wizard of Mars and Games Wizards Play: The Hallowe'en novella "Not on My Patch," the Christmas novelette "How Lovely Are Thy Branches," and the novel Lifeboats.

A short story "Not on My Patch" was released in October 2011. The story was scheduled to be published together with other short stories in late 2012 in a one-story-per-month anthology entitled The Wizards’ Year.

On February 2, 2016, Duane released the tenth novel in the series, Games Wizards Play, involving a tournament called "The Invitational", where hundreds of wizards compete all-out for a year long apprenticeship under Earth's Planetary Wizard.

Three other books within the Young Wizards universe are On Ordeal: Roshaun ke Nelaid, 
On Ordeal: Mamvish fsh Wimsih,
and On Ordeal: Ronan Nolan Jnr.
Each book focuses on a wizard and their first trial against the Lone Power. The first book's subject is a humanoid prince who first appeared in Wizard's Holiday; the second's is a saurian Species Archivist (a wizard who specializes in relocating endangered species to places where they can thrive) who first appeared in A Wizard of Mars; and the third is about Ronan, a young human wizard whom Nita meets during the events of A Wizard Abroad.
All three are part of the Interim Errantry: On Ordeal series, and have since been published digitally as a single volume titled Interim Errantry 2: On Ordeal.

A special extra Young Wizards novella was released by Duane on December 2nd, 2020 entitled Owl Be Home for Christmas, telling the story of a magical owl that wants to reclaim its home tree that was chopped down to become the annual Rockefeller Center Christmas Tree in New York amid the backdrop of the COVID-19 pandemic happening that year.

The official title of book 12 has yet to be released, but in a 2012 interview with GeekDads, Diane Duane used the working title, Wizardry in Shadow.

Feline wizards
Three other books are not strictly in the Young Wizards series, but take place in the same setting:

 The Book of Night with Moon (1997) (US , UK )
 To Visit the Queen (1998), published in the UK as On Her Majesty's Wizardly Service
 The Big Meow (2011) pre-edited version published online; (2017) ebook version
All three were released as eBooks available from Diane Duane's web store in December 2017.

Adult wizards
Short stories about adult wizards in the same setting.
 "Theobroma", published in the anthology Wizards, Inc., edited by Martin H. Greenberg and Loren L. Coleman
 Short Circuit (projected)

Concepts

The Powers That Be
The series shows the influence of many religious and mythological tropes from around the world, and the traits of traditional angels and various gods or heroes of ancient mythology are united in semi-divine, demiurgic beings referred to as the Powers that Be. The Powers exist outside of mortal time, capable of manifesting themselves anywhere in the universe, at any point in time. They were created by a being known only as "the One" (the source of all energy, wizardry, and creative forces in all of the universes) and are portrayed as Its active assistants in the business of creating and maintaining the universe.

During the process of Creation, one of the Powers that Be—originally described as the greatest and most glorious of Powers, second only to the One—went apart from the others and invented the "gift" of death (often referred to in the series under the blanket term of entropy,) turning it loose in the universe and thus corrupting or subverting much work done by the other Powers. This rebellious (or at least extremely self-willed) being became known as the Lone Power, and as a result of Its destructive behavior was cast out of the creative order by the One. It has since manifested in many avatars or alternate forms throughout the universe. Its incarnations roam the multiverse, seeking new species to trick into accepting Its "gift". When a species becomes sentient, a process called "The Choice" begins, during which the Lone Power appears and offers the species the opportunity to support a lifestyle or course of action which may seem tempting but ultimately serves entropy (not coincidentally, the Lone Power is often compared to, or even equated to, The Devil). However, the species also has the opportunity to reject the offered "gift" and choose to fight against entropic behavior—but that does not mean that the species has necessarily chosen to fight against pain, death, and evil. The Lone Power is conniving and devious, so to make the right Choice is difficult. Rejecting the Choice outright can sometimes lead to suffering for the entire species.

Humanity's Choice appears to have ties to the Biblical story of creation involving Adam and Eve eating the fruit from the tree of Knowledge of Good and Evil, with the Lone Power being "behind" the purported actions of the serpent.

When involved in a Choice, the Lone Power tends to work subtly, controlling minds or events to result in its "gift" being accepted. It sometimes appears physically when becoming involved in the Choice process, though almost always in some kind of disguise.

One of the central themes of the series, however, is the idea that the Lone Power truly wants to return to the light, and in some senses already has due to events in the third book, "High Wizardry". However, because the Powers primarily exist outside of time the reconciliation of the single "projection" of the Lone Power does nothing to change other projections of the Lone Power created throughout the eons, leading to further conflict.

Wizardry
To combat the Lone Power, the One created wizards. Wizards manifest their power through The Speech, which allows them to describe the desired effects of the wizardry exactly. "It is the language of the Universe."  Non-wizards can learn the Speech, but cannot effect change using it.

The Powers that Be choose individuals who have the potential to become wizards. The selection is often motivated by the need for a particular individual to solve a particular problem. Once a person has been offered the opportunity to become a wizard, if he or she decides to accept it, that person will be offered the "Wizard's Oath"—a pledge to fight entropy wherever it may be found.

If the potential wizard takes the Oath, the event is immediately followed by an Ordeal—a period during which the wizard may combat the Lone Power directly, or perform some other difficult task. The Ordeal is typically when a Wizard is at the peak of his or her power. The younger they are when they take the Oath the more power they will possess and the greater their Ordeal will be. They will slowly lose power as they get older, though they will gain experience and finesse in return.  Not all Ordeals are successful, however, and the result of being unprepared or careless during Ordeal is often death. Even if the Ordeal is successful, it may involve the new Wizard giving their life to stop the Lone Power, saving a species or planet. (Ordeals are said to account for a certain percentage of what the real world perceives as "missing children".)

Every wizard has access to the Wizard's Manual, a book written in the Speech that gives the reader as much information about the business of wizardry and spells as he or she requires or is capable of handling. The Manual can take many forms and is often tailored to the race and personality of the wizard in question. Water-dwelling wizards, such as dolphins and whales, use the Sea itself as their Manual, drawing answers for their questions out of the songs of the ocean, aka the "Heart of the Sea". Cat wizards have a similar method of accessing the Manual called "The Whispering". Human wizards tend to use books as the Manual, although some hear voices like the cats and whales, and Irish wizards memorize the information. Recent advances in technology have allowed some wizards to use digital versions of the Manual, such as laptops and, more recently, iPod variations (called WizPods).

Main characters

Nita
Juanita Louise "Nita" Callahan begins the series in junior high school as a typical "book-nerd" who is often bullied by stronger girls. As the series goes on, she deals with such issues as parents, romance, death, sex, and social bullying. She lives at home with her parents and her genius kid sister Dairine. She is often called "Neets." She loves horse books and listens to Journey (according to High Wizardry). Her wizardly specialty initially seems to be the art of dealing with plants and the living world (sometimes referred to as organic wizardry), but later on shifts more toward wizardly theory and manipulation of kernels—cores of energy found at the center of every person, planet and universe that act as replicable centers for major wizardries. Recent events have suggested that Nita may be switching specialties again, this time into precognition and oracular dreaming, also developing a connection with water.

The third book, High Wizardry, briefly deals with the possibility that Nita and Kit have feelings for each other. In the 9th installment, A Wizard of Mars, Nita admits that she may be jealous of Aurilelde, a female alien that Kit seems to be attracted to. Later, in the heat of the moment, while fighting with the alien princess, she calls Kit her "boyfriend," though she and Kit are not officially "together" until the end of the novel. In the process, she learns that Kit was not attracted to Aurilelde, but her, in a complicated series of events.

Nita has a brief relationship with the Irish wizard Ronan in A Wizard Abroad, although when he reappears in Wizards at War, there isn't any sort of tension.

Kit
Christopher Kellen "Kit" Rodriguez also starts the series in junior high school, dealing with the issue of becoming a responsible adult. Despite being one year younger than Nita, Kit is usually the more mature member of the pair. Kit is in Nita's grade in school, having skipped a grade. His birthday is August 25. In the first book, he often gets teased because of his Spanish accent and his height, but after their Ordeal, matters improve. Kit also lives at his home in Nita's neighborhood with his parents, his older sister Carmela, and his dog Ponch. The oldest child in his family, Helena, lives at college. Kit is skilled with mechanical objects and sometimes, through Ponch, he is skilled in 'scent'. Kit found his Manual in a used bookstore in NYC.

In A Wizard of Mars, Kit admits to himself that he is attracted to Nita, and that he may have never pursued his feelings because he was afraid of going beyond their friendship. This occurs after he finds himself strangely attracted to the Martian princess Aurilelde, who reminds Kit slightly of Nita when he meets her. His affection for the alien is extinguished when he finds out about Aurilelde's ill intentions but finds out that Aurilelde is actually a counterpart of Nita.

Dairine
Dairine E. "Dair" Callahan is a brainy child, wise beyond her years. She is known for being obsessed with all things Star Wars and wants to be a Jedi. Although she is three years younger than Nita, she cannot stand it if Nita knows anything that she does not. She figures out that Nita has odd powers, finds out about wizardry, and in High Wizardry becomes a wizard herself, enormously powerful and prematurely skilled, though, as with all wizards, her sheer power diminishes with time. Her Ordeal is a pivotal moment in the history of the universe, as she not only temporarily becomes the Manual, but helps to redeem the Lone Power. Dairine's skill comes through computers, and she is mentally connected to a race of silicon beings and their sentient planet. She calls her computer (which is also her Manual) Spot. There is speculation that she has romantic feelings for Roshaun. According to the New Millennial Edition of High Wizardry, her birthday is October 20, 1997.

The Lone Power
The Lone Power is the chief antagonist of the series, and appears in various avatars and/or as Itself in each book. It is named as "the Witherer, the Kindler of Wildfires, the one who decreed darkness, the Starsnuffer," (So You Want to Be a Wizard -p238). It is a renegade Power who invented entropy in all its manifestations, including death. Wizards exist in order to fight Its influence, with varying degrees of success. Addressed formally as "Fairest and Fallen", the Lone Power used to be one of the "good" Powers That Be, but Its actions were regarded as "evil" and It fell from grace.

Throughout the series, the Lone Power, as a result of Its actions, deeds, and history, is often equated to Satan, an evil entity in most monotheistic religions. For example, in the second book of the series, Nita is asked if she attained her wizardry through a deal with the Devil, to which she responds "Kit and I are the last people that One wants anything to do with."

Other wizards

Humans

Tom & Carl
Tom B. Swale and Carl J. Romeo are Senior Wizards who appear in each book. Originally introduced as local Advisories, they are promoted to Senior between the events of the first and second novels. They live together in the same suburb as Nita, Kit and Dairine, and generally appear in order to advise or to correct them. Tom is a writer of spells and fiction, while Carl sells commercial airtime in television. His wizardly specialization appears to be in time and its manipulation. Tom and Carl are wise, tolerant, and funny; Nita frequently refers to them as examples of adult wizardry.

Ronan
Ronan Nolan, Jr is a wizard whom Nita meets during the events of A Wizard Abroad. His body is the host of the One's Champion and he also possesses the Spear Luin (Spear of Light), making him extremely magically powerful until the One's Champion has to leave him in Wizards at War. He is one of the main characters in Wizards at War and is Nita's love interest in A Wizard Abroad, eventually kissing her. On his Ordeal he 'took the sea in', briefly controlling an entire portion of the ocean, essentially becoming it. In Wizards at War, he becomes a love interest of Kit's sister, Carmela, a theme that continues in A Wizard of Mars.

Eventually the tension between him and Nita decreases after Nita says that Carmela is "all his" in Wizards at War.

Darryl
Darryl McAllister is introduced in A Wizard Alone and appears briefly in Wizards at War. In A Wizard Alone, Kit is sent to help Darryl in his Ordeal. He soon learns that Darryl is autistic and that his Ordeal is being deliberately sabotaged by the Lone Power. Utilizing Ponch's ability to "walk" through universes, Kit enters Darryl's mind to assist him in the Ordeal, but overexposure causes Kit to exhibit antisocial tendencies and mood swings picked up from Darryl himself. Nita, however, discovers that Darryl is an Abdal—a figure of tremendous power and a conduit for goodness from the One—and that he is actually tricking the Lone One, making him think that he's in control so that Darryl can trap him in a self-created universe and never again let him out. Nita and Kit put a stop to the cycle by reaching out to Darryl together, who swears to the Lone One that he will remain in the universe if the Lone One returns to it someday, and then circumvents the Ordeal by taking advantage of his Abdal ability to be in two places at once. In the original version, Darryl uses this ability to split his autistic "self" and leaves it behind in the universe he created, so that the Lone Power is forever trapped there with the autistic Darryl. In the new "Young Millennium" Revised Editions, this was changed so that a mirrored version of Darryl watches over the Lone Power. Darryl continues to be autistic for the remainder of the series (in the revised editions) although he regains his coping abilities. Though the Lone Power itself is not trapped, the manifestation targeting Darryl is forever locked away from the rest of the universes.

Non-Humans

S'reee
S'reee is the whale wizard who acts as the Senior for Earth's oceans. She has a special relationship with Nita, who saves her life in Deep Wizardry. In DW she asks Nita and Kit for help performing the Song of the Twelve, a complex wizardly ritual. She is thrust into responsibility very young after the death of her mentor, but in later books she seems to be more confident with her duties. S'reee helps Kit implement a 'cleanup' wizardry to clean the waters surrounding Manhattan at the beginning of The Wizard's Dilemma.  She appears briefly in Wizards at War. In A Wizard of Mars, during a talk with Nita, it was said that S'reee was dating another whale who is a food critic.

Roshaun
Roshaun ke Nelaid am Seriv am Teliuyve am Meseph am Veliz am Teriaunst am det Nuiiliat (sometimes "am det Wellakhit") is a haughty humanoid alien prince from the planet Wellakh. He is first featured in Wizard's Holiday and remains a prominent character until his disappearance in Wizards at War. He is one of the exchange students from the wizardly exchange program and his skills focus on stars. He has/had a "sort of friendship" with Dairine; though it is unclear what these feelings were, they seem to be of a romantic nature.

Sker'ret
Sker'ret is one of the exchange students in Wizard's Holiday. His species, the Rirhait, resemble giant metal centipedes and have physiologies that allow them to eat almost anything. Sker'ret is skilled with machinery and teleportation wizardry. He is one of the children of the Stationmaster of the Crossings on Rirhath B, and takes over the position for a time during the wizards' war.

Filif
Filifermanhathrhumneits'elhhessaifnth or "Filif" is one of the exchange students in Wizard's Holiday. The program caused him enormous culture shock, because Filif is not just an alien wizard: he is an alien wizard shaped like a Christmas tree, so learning about vegetarianism as an exception to general human diets was like being in a world full of cannibals.

Culture clashes aside, Filif is a very personable sort of individual: curious, friendly, and very easy-going. He takes almost everything in stride and is eager to learn about human culture. His favorite discoveries so far are baseball hats and bright colors, even if his fashion sense is, to put it politely, nonexistent. He calls them "decorations" and prefers bright orange swim trunks and Victoria's Secret lingerie. He is very magically powerful and excels at writing new spells, as well as designing illusions.

Pralaya

Pralaya is a wizard from a different universe that Nita meets while experimenting with kernels in The Wizard's Dilemma. He bears much resemblance to an otter, though with six legs and antennae. Nita meets him while retrieving the kernel of a "practice universe" from a canal. Later in the story, he is possessed by the Lone Power and presents Nita with the deal to give up her powers in order to save her mother's life. When Nita tells Pralaya that the Lone Power had been using his body, It kills him.

Quelt

Quelt is the Alaalid that Nita and Kit visit during the excursus in Wizard's Holiday. She is the only wizard of her species (besides Druvah).

Pont

Pont is an alien that Nita meets in The Wizard's Dilemma when in the practice universes. He is a plural—one person in multiple bodies—which is apparently normal in his universe. He looks to Nita like five giant blue ball bearings.

Mamvish

Mamvish is a "species archivist" of extraordinary wizardly power who shows up in A Wizard of Mars.  She is of saurian appearance and considerably more massive than any elephant.  Her power levels are so huge that the Lone Power declined to show up for Mamvish's  ordeal.  Personally she is "kind of a goof" and is almost addicted to Earth-grown tomatoes.

Other characters

Humans

Harry Callahan
Harold Edward Callahan, Nita and Dairine's father. After his wife's death, he grows closer to his daughters and also to the world of wizardry, serving as a comforter and encourager to wizards who are going through a hard time, notably to Filif and Tom in Wizard's Holiday. Harry is a florist and landscape gardener; Nita believes she gets her talents with living things (especially plants) from him. Nita and Dairine inherited their magic powers from his side of the family.

Betty Callahan
Nita and Dairine's late mother, and the focus of The Wizard's Dilemma. A former professional ballerina, Betty passed on both her red hair and her natural grace to Dairine. She passes away sometime between The Wizard's Dilemma and A Wizard Alone.

Carmela Rodriguez
Kit's sister, a couple of years older than he. She bought a laser dissociator off the Mizarthu shopping network, which she uses to help Nita and Sker'ret defend The Crossings. She is in the process of learning The Speech, despite the fact that she's not a wizard. Once Carmela learns The Speech, she spends most of her time watching TV from across the galaxy, and talking to her new alien friends. She seems to have a talent for languages, as she was learning Japanese before taking up the study of The Speech, and presumably knows Spanish as well. She helps Dairine deal with the exchange wizards in Wizard's Holiday.  In Wizards at War Carmela also manages to free the entire group when they are captured at a crucial moment. During A Wizard of Mars she assists in the translation of an ancient text found in a cavern on Mars.

Helena Rodriguez

Kit's oldest sister. She is away attending college and lives there. She originally believed that Kit had made a deal with the devil. As of A Wizard of Mars, she believes he is a mutant.

Mr. Millman
Robert Millman is the school therapist; he first appears in A Wizard Alone to help Nita and, later, Dairine, with their mother's death. Although he is not himself a wizard, he knows of wizards and so recognizes Nita for what she is. Later, in Wizards at War, he helps by arranging for them to get time off from school.

Non-humans

Ponch
Poncho (Kit's black Labrador/Border Collie mix) is an average dog. More worried about food (and squirrels) than anything else, Ponch accompanies Kit and Nita on some of their adventures. As the series progresses it is obvious that something is different about Ponch; at the beginning of the series, he is featured as a minor character, mostly a source of canine comic relief, but further on his character is developed into more of a supporting role and partner to Kit. He starts to find and even create alternate universes (his favorite being a squirrel universe) and eventually is revealed to be a canine Power, namely the canine version of the One, according to the Transcendent Pig. After this, Kit mourns his loss, only to have a stray dog come up to him and reveal that Ponch is inside all dogs now.

Peach
Machu Picchu is an irascible scarlet macaw owned by Tom and Carl. Extremely grumpy and given to showing off, she can also tell the future: her advice saves Nita and Kit in all of the first three books. In High Wizardry she accompanies Nita and Kit to find Dairine, and they discover that Peach is actually an avatar of the Winged Defender, or The One's Champion, one of the Powers that Be. Nita recognises Peach in Ronan in A Wizard Abroad.

Fred
Khairelikoblepharehglukumeilichephreidosd'enagouni, nicknamed Fred by Kit from the syllable phreid in his name, is a white hole who features in So You Want to Be a Wizard. He appears when Nita and Kit do a finding spell to try to retrieve Nita's space pen, and bears a message for Tom and Carl. Fred is the catalyst for Nita and Kit's Ordeal, starting them on a quest to find the Book of Night with Moon; he is comic in his appreciation of the delights of Earth and he becomes good friends with Nita and Kit. At the end of SYWTBAW, he sacrifices himself by converting his mass to light, relighting the moon and allowing Nita and Kit to save Manhattan from an incursion by the Lone Power.

Ed
ed'Rashtekeresket t'k Gh'shestaesteh, the Master Shark and the Pale Slayer, appears in Deep Wizardry to play the appropriate role in the Song of the Twelve. He is the master of his species, a great white shark; throughout the book he is both aloof and threatening. Although he frightens Nita, they strike up an unusual friendship. He is dryly funny, although at first Nita doesn't find him so. His role in the song is to devour Nita, as the Silent One; however, at the end of the book, Ed sacrifices himself rather than let Nita die, borrowing her wizardry to take the Silent One's role in the song. But, perhaps because of this borrowed wizardry, he is seen in Timeheart in the novel's coda.

Spot
Spot is Dairine's sentient Apple computer, originally an Apple IIc variant, but later appearing to be a Macintosh PowerBook, who serves as Dairine's wizard's manual. Spot first shows up in High Wizardry and is present or "nearby" in the remainder of the series whenever Dairine is. He is shy around others, but (according to Dairine) is quite talkative in one-on-one conversations with her. He also has the ability to upgrade himself, changing his platform and appearance as the series progresses to keep up with contemporary technology. After getting an upgrade from his siblings (Dairine's 'children'), he seems to develop a sense of the future.

Transcendent Pig
Inspired by Chinese mythology, this is a being of mysterious origins, first mentioned in So You Want to Be a Wizard and first seen in The Wizard's Dilemma. He has been called Chao, but it is unclear if that is a personal name or merely an epithet. The Pig is designated as being between mortals and the Powers That Be, more than a mortal but less than a Power, and is Omnipresent though not necessarily Omniscient. However, according to The One's Champion, not even the Powers That Be know where the Pig came from. The purpose the Pig serves is unknown, but it is believed that it knows the meaning of life for an unexplained reason, but it does not just let anyone know. This makes it wizardly custom to immediately ask the Pig the meaning of life upon seeing it. He appears in Wizards at War as well.

Temporal setting
Time in the Young Wizard series does not progress in a straightforward manner, and in fact there is some disagreement among fans as to the chronology of events in the series. For example, in So You Want to Be a Wizard, Carmela is fifteen, Nita is thirteen, Kit twelve, and Dairine eleven. By Wizard's Holiday, they should have all aged two years, since two summer vacations (Deep Wizardry and A Wizard Abroad) have passed. However, Nita progresses only one grade from High Wizardry to The Wizard's Dilemma, which means that either Deep Wizardry and A Wizard Abroad take place in the same summer, or Nita and the other characters got held back in school. Also, in A Wizard Alone Nita mentions that she has "a couple of years' more of experience" at wizardry than Dairine, which would imply that Nita had already been a wizard for two years before Dairine took her Oath. In Wizard's Holiday, Dairine says she and Spot have been "working together" for a couple years. Wizards at War puts Nita's age at fourteen.  In High Wizardry, Dairine is eleven.  In the latest book, A Wizard of Mars, Dairine's dad says about her, "She's only eleven!"

The books, however, are always set in the year of publication. Few dates are ever given, but Deep Wizardry explicitly says that the events occur in 1985 while High Wizardry, set two months later, gives the eleven-year-old Dairine a 1978 birthdate. The discrepancy in time is particularly noticeable when it comes to computers; in High Wizardry Nita's family obtains a brand new "Apple IIIc+," apparently modelled on the Apple IIc+ of 1988, while less than a year or two later in Wizard's Holiday Dairine's computer Spot is apparently imitating an Apple Titanium PowerBook.

Even more obviously, in the 2005 podcast version of the 1986 short story "Uptown Local," Duane changes a line so that one minor character is using an iPod, and in Wizards at War a fellow wizard shows off his specialized manual known as a WizPod. In the same book, Nita thinks about the Manhattan skyline when someone refers to recent troubles, signifying that it takes place after 9/11. Also in "Wizards at War", the Lone Power refers to "a tower or two crumbling" in his gloating speech. The sliding scale is similar to those used in the James Bond films, DC Comics and Marvel comics.

New Timeline
In August 2012, Diane Duane released "The New Millennium Edition" of So You Want To Be a Wizard. This sets the events of that book firmly in 2008. The New Millennium Editions are intended to repair the "very broken, inconsistent and frankly dysfunctional timeline" which was making it hard for the series to find new readers. The new timeline sees all the first nine books happen over a span of about 3 years, as Dairine is said to be 11 in book 1, and she is now said to be 13 in book 9. 
The first nine books are now available as New Millennium Editions. The tenth, Games Wizards Play, was originally published in the new timeline and therefore will not be re-released as a New Millennium Edition.

Notes

References

External links 

 YoungWizards.com - interactive website
 Author's Weblog
 Diane Duane's Bibliography
 Uptown Local and Other Interventions

 
Fantasy novel series